Amegilla subcoerulea is a species of bee belonging to the family Apidae subfamily Apinae.

References

External links
 http://animaldiversity.org/accounts/Amegilla_subcoerulea/classification/#Amegilla_subcoerulea
 https://www.academia.edu/7390502/AN_UPDATED_CHECKLIST_OF_BEES_OF_SRI_LANKA_WITH_NEW_RECORDS

Apinae
Insects of Sri Lanka
Insects described in 1841
Taxa named by Amédée Louis Michel le Peletier